Illumination (2007) is an album by the American ambient musician Robert Rich.  This CD is published as a companion piece to Michael Somoroff’s installation Illumination I originally created for the famed Rothko Chapel, on the occasion of the installation’s move to The Aldrich Contemporary Art Museum in Ridgefield, CT as the audio track to Somoroff’s Illumination, a multimedia installation at BravinLee Programs in Chelsea, N.Y.C. during the summer of 2007.

Track listing
”Echo I” – 7:16
”Prism” – 3:36
”Point Line Plane” – 16:52
”Curtain” – 15:41
”Plato's Cave” – 14:10
”Temple” – 7:57
”Echo II” – 5:19

External links
album feature from Robert Rich’s official web site

Robert Rich (musician) albums
2007 albums